Catocala solntsevi is a moth of the family Erebidae first described by Andreĭ Valentinovich Sviridov in 1997. It is found in Guangdong in China and Vietnam.

The wingspan is about 75 mm.

References

External links
"Catocala solntsevi Sviridov, 1997 タムダオキシタバ". Digital Moths of Asia. Retrieved October 20, 2019.

solntsevi
Moths described in 1997
Moths of Asia